Hlivištia is a village and municipality in the Sobrance District in the Košice Region of east Slovakia.

History
In historical records the village was first mentioned in 1413.

Geography
The village lies at an altitude of 262 metres and covers an area of 20.21 km².
It has a population of about 385 people.

Culture
The village has a public library.

Genealogical resources

The records for genealogical research are available at the state archive "Statny Archiv in Presov, Slovakia"

 Roman Catholic church records (births/marriages/deaths): 1879–1897 (parish B)
 Greek Catholic church records (births/marriages/deaths): 1834–1910 (parish A)

See also
 List of municipalities and towns in Slovakia

External links
 
http://en.e-obce.sk/obec/hlivistia/hlivistia.html
https://web.archive.org/web/20080208225314/http://www.statistics.sk/mosmis/eng/run.html
http://www.hlivistia.sk
Surnames of living people in Hlivistia

Villages and municipalities in Sobrance District